Michel Amacker (born 29 September 1956) is a Swiss retired footballer who played in the 1970s as midfielder. 

Amacker played his youth football with FC Raron and advanced to their first team during their 1973–74 season as they were promoted from the 1st League to the Nationalliga B, the second tier of Swiss football. He played with them the next season as first choice mid-fielder in 25 of their 26 league matches, scoring four goals, as they eventually prevented relegation in a play-off match against Mendrisiostar.

Amacker joined FC Basel's first team for their 1975–76 season under head-coach Helmut Benthaus. After one test match and one match in the Cup of the Alps, Amacker played his domestic league debut for the club in the away game on 23 August 1975 as Basel won 3–2 against Winterthur.

Amacker stayed with the club one season, in which he played a total of six games for Basel without scoring a goal. Two of these games were in the Nationalliga A, one in the Cup of the Alps and three were friendly games.

Following this season with Basel, Amacker returned to Raron for the 1976–77 season. But the team suffered relegation and he moved on to play for La Chaux-de-Fonds, who also played in the second tier of Swiss football. In his second season with LCdF, Amacker and the club were Nationalliga B champions and won promotion.

After these two seasons Amacker returned once more to his club of origin.

References

Sources
 Die ersten 125 Jahre. Publisher: Josef Zindel im Friedrich Reinhardt Verlag, Basel. 
 Verein "Basler Fussballarchiv" Homepage

FC Basel players
FC La Chaux-de-Fonds players
Swiss men's footballers
Association football midfielders
1956 births
Living people